Helen Sarah Margolis  is a British physicist who is a Senior Fellow and Head of Science for Time and Frequency at the National Physical Laboratory. Her research considers the use of optical frequency metrology using femtosecond combs.

Early life and education 
Margolis studied physics at the University of Oxford. She completed her undergraduate and graduate training at Pembroke College, where she tested theories in quantum electrodynamics. In particular, she made use of electron beams to trap highly ionised atoms. After graduating, she remained at Oxford as a postdoctoral researcher, during which time she started working with the National Physical Laboratory.

Research and career 
Margolis joined the National Physical Laboratory in 1998. She developed femtosecond combs for optical frequency metrology. Her research looks to create highly accurate optical atomic clocks using trapped ions. She serves as coordinator of the European project Robust Optical Clocks for International Timescales (ROCIT). In this capacity, she seeks to make optical clocks more robust, such that they can run reliably, reproducibly and unattended for extended periods of time.

In 2017, Margolis was made Visiting Professor at the University of Oxford. Working with Mark Walport, Margolis helped to draft the Blackett review, The Quantum Age: technological opportunities. She was appointed a Member of the British Empire in 2019 for her service to metrology.

Selected publications

References

Living people
Year of birth missing (living people)
Members of the Order of the British Empire
Alumni of Pembroke College, Oxford
British physicists
Women physicists
British women physicists